R. Leslie Jackson was the Chief Justice of the Provincial Court of New Brunswick until 14 January 2014, when he was continued in office as a supernumerary.

Jackson received his LL.B. in 1970 from the University of New Brunswick. His time in private practice ended on 7 November 1997 when he was created a Provincial Court justice. He was promoted to the position of Associate Chief Justice on 9 January 2006.

Notable cases
 The release, as the result of an application by the CBC and the Telegraph-Journal, of search warrant and other documents in the Richard Oland homicide, although the publication ban was partially maintained.
 The 2017 labour dispute between the RCMP and Employment Canada, which occurred as the result of Justin Bourque's murderous actions.

References

Judges in New Brunswick
University of New Brunswick alumni